Muskelin is a protein that in humans is encoded by the MKLN1 gene.

Interactions
MKLN1 has been shown to interact with RANBP9.

References

Further reading

Kelch proteins